A Cube of Sugar (or ) is a 2011 Iranian drama film directed by Seyyed Reza Mir-Karimi. It had its world premiere at the Busan International Film Festival on 8 October 2011.

On 24 September 2012, the film was selected as the Iranian entry for the Best Foreign Language Oscar at the 85th Academy Awards. However, on the same day, the head of Iran's government-controlled cinema agency called for a boycott of the Oscars due to a video on YouTube titled Innocence of Muslims that originated in the United States. Reuters reported that Iran's Culture and Islamic Guidance Minister Mohammad Hosseini had confirmed that Iran would boycott.

Plot
The film features two concurrent stories: the main plot centering on Pasandideh, and a subplot focusing on Hormoz. The main plot chronicles a day of life in a very traditional Iranian family. Pasandideh, the youngest girl in the family, lives with her mother, her old uncle, and aunt. They live in an old house in a village. She is soon supposed to marry a family friend's grandson, who is studying abroad in a western country. Everything is already arranged for Pasandideh's marriage, and all of her sisters arrive at the old house one by one.

Meanwhile, Hormoz, the husband of Pasandideh's sister, has recently been released from prison. With the aid of Hamid, the husband of another sister of Pasandideh, he tries to find a treasure. They believe it is buried somewhere in Pasandideh's house and sneak around while the marriage ceremony is taking place.

Cast
 Puneh Abdolkarim-Zadeh as Shamsi
 Amir Hossein Arman as Ghasem
 Farhad Aslani as Haj Naser
 Shamsi Fazlollahi as Uncle's wife
 Hedayat Hashemi as Hamid
 Asghar Hemmat as Hormoz
 Negar Javaherian as Pasandideh
 Reza Kianian as Jafar
 Baran Kosari as Grooms Relative
 Rohullah Mofidi as Doctor
 Parivash Nazarieh as Masumeh
 Saeed Poursamimi as Uncle Ezzatolah
 Rima Raminfar as Azam

Release
Acclaimed film producer Abbas Kiarostami designed one of the posters that was used to promote A Cube of Sugar.

Awards and accolades
Iran Cinema Celebration:
Won: Best Poster
Nominated: Best Film (Reza Mirkarimi), Best Director (Mirkarimi), Best Actor (Saeed Poursamimi)
Fajr Film Festival 2011: Best Costume Design (nominated)
Fajr Film Festival 2011: Best Soundboard (Bahman Ardalan, nominated)
Fajr Film Festival 2011: Best Actress (Rima Raminfar, nominated)

See also
 List of submissions to the 85th Academy Awards for Best Foreign Language Film
 List of Iranian submissions for the Academy Award for Best Foreign Language Film

References

External links
 

2011 films
2011 drama films
2010s Persian-language films
Iranian drama films